California's 18th State Assembly district is one of 80 California State Assembly districts. It is currently represented by Democrat Mia Bonta of Alameda after winning the special election.

District profile 
The district encompasses the central East Bay, centered on the city of Oakland.

Alameda County – 31.1%
 Alameda
 Oakland – 79.6%
 San Leandro

Election results from statewide races

List of Assembly Members 
Due to redistricting, the 18th district has been moved around different parts of the state. The current iteration resulted from the 2011 redistricting by the California Citizens Redistricting Commission.

Election results 1992 - present

2021 (Special) 
Primary was June 29, 2021; Special (label as General) on August 31, 2021.

2020

2018

2016

2014

2012

2010

2008

2006

2004

2002

2000

1998

1996

1994

1992

See also 
 California State Assembly
 California State Assembly districts
 Districts in California

References

External links 
 District map from the California Citizens Redistricting Commission

18
Government of Alameda County, California